USS Mayflower (PY-1) (later as USCGC Mayflower (WPG-183)) was a ,
 motor vessel originally built as a private yacht that went on to serve in a variety of military, governmental, and commercial roles.

She had an extremely long and diverse career. She served as a private yacht, merchant ship and as the presidential yacht for five United States presidents (T. Roosevelt, Taft, Wilson, Harding and Coolidge). She also served as a warship, and was possibly the only US Navy ship (certainly one of the very few) to have been in active commissioned service during the Spanish–American War, World War I and World War II. She was also one of the few ships to have served in both the United States and Israeli navies.

Private yacht
Mayflower was launched in 1896 by J. and G. Thompson, of Clydebank, Scotland, as a luxurious steam yacht for millionaire Ogden Goelet, who died on board her in August 1897. Her sister ship, the Nahma, said to be almost identical, although being longer, was built at the same time and in the same yard for Goelet's brother, Robert Goelet, later became .

The following year she was acquired by the United States Navy, the second ship to have the name Mayflower.

Spanish–American War
With the Spanish–American War requiring that the Navy expand rapidly, she was purchased by the Navy from Goelet's estate and commissioned at the New York Navy Yard as Mayflower, on 24 March 1898.

Mayflower joined Admiral William T. Sampson's squadron at Key West, Florida, on 20 April. Two days later, the squadron sailed to blockade Havana, Cuba. En route, Mayflower captured the Spanish schooner Santiago Apostol. She also took a number of fishing boats and coastal trading vessels. On 11 May, she boarded a large British merchant steamer, which also carried the name Mayflower, and sent the blockade runner to the United States under a prize crew. On 14 May, Alfonso led two Spanish gunboats out of the harbor hoping to break through the American blockade. Mayflowers guns engaged the Spanish warships and drove them back to shelter under the guns of Morro Castle. For the rest of the war, Mayflower guarded the ports of Santiago de Cuba and Cienfuegos.

Caribbean
Early in 1899, the yacht steamed to New York, where she decommissioned on 2 February, to be fitted out for special service in Puerto Rican waters. She recommissioned on 15 June 1900. At San Juan, she served as headquarters for the government of the island being formed by the first American Governor Charles H. Allen.

In 1902, Mayflower twice served as Admiral George Dewey's flagship. In November 1903, Rear Admiral Joseph Coghlan, flew his flag when off Panama, during the revolution which established Panamanian independence and pointed toward the construction of the Panama Canal. She sailed to Europe in the summer of 1904, and in the fall carried Secretary of War William Howard Taft, on an inspection tour of the West Indies. Mayflower was decommissioned at New York, on 1 November 1904, for conversion to a presidential yacht.

US Presidential Yacht

Recommissioned on 25 July 1905, with Commander Cameron Winslow, in command, she immediately sailed for Oyster Bay, Long Island, New York, to prepare for the peace conference which ended the Russo-Japanese War. President Theodore Roosevelt, introduced the Russian and Japanese delegations on board Mayflower, on 5 August. The ship continued to play a prominent role in support of the negotiations which won Roosevelt the Nobel Peace Prize.

 
After duty as a dispatch boat protecting American interests in Santo Domingo, in 1906, Mayflower served as presidential yacht until 1929. On 22 July 1908, she collided with the American 211-grt schooner Menawa, in Long Island Sound; Menawa was lost, but all six people aboard her survived.

Mayflower was the scene of many diplomatic and social events during her years as the presidential yacht. Many members of the world's royal families visited the yacht and numerous persons of great prominence signed her guestbook. President Woodrow Wilson, selected Mayflower as the setting for much of his courtship of Edith Bolling Galt.

One of Herbert Hoover's early acts as president was to dispense with Mayflower as an economy measure, saving upkeep costs of $300,000 per year, . She was decommissioned at the Philadelphia Navy Yard, on 22 March 1929, and her Filipino stewards and much of her furniture were transferred to the presidential retreat at Rapidan Camp. Placed up for auction, there were no bidders, and the ship was recommissioned for military use. During this overhaul at the Philadelphia Navy Yard, an intense fire broke out on 24 January 1931. So much water was pumped into her, that she sank and had to be raised.

Private ownership
The yacht was sold on 19 October 1931, to Leo P. Coe, agent for Frank P. Parish, a wealthy financier known as "The boy wizard of LaSalle Street" (Chicago's Wall Street). The following year while he was having the ship restored to her original luxurious splendor, by Henry J. Gielow Inc., of New York City, Parish's fortunes turned forcing him to sell the yacht shortly before he fled from the country to escape from prosecution and elude irate investors. During the Depression years, a number of successive owners tried to promote a wide variety of projects for the ship, including use in the South America coastal trade, restoration as a historic relic, use as a floating dance salon, and even sale to the Japanese Government to be scrapped as Japan sought still to strengthen her war machine. However, a complex web of legal difficulties, a shortage of money, and marginal business conditions frustrated these enterprises while the ship idled in Atlantic ports from New York to Jacksonville, Florida, awaiting an opportunity for future service.

Service in USCG and US Navy during World War II

After the US entered World War II, the War Shipping Administration purchased Mayflower from Broadfoot Iron Works Inc., Wilmington, North Carolina, on 31 July 1942, and renamed her Butte. Transferred to the Coast Guard on 6 September 1943, the ship was recommissioned as USCGC Mayflower (WPG-183) on 19 October 1943. She patrolled the Atlantic coast guarding against German U-boats and escorted coastal shipping besides serving as a radar training ship at Norfolk and Boston.

As a commercial vessel

Decommissioned on 1 July 1946, Mayflower was sold at Baltimore, to Frank M. Shaw, on 8 January 1947, for use in the Arctic as a sealer. However, while sailing for sealing waters between Greenland and Labrador, early in March, Mayflower was damaged by fire off Point Lookout, and forced to return to Baltimore. Collins Distributors Inc., purchased the ship early in 1948, installed new boilers in her at New York, and documented her as SS Malla, under the Panamanian flag. She was subsequently fitted out at Genoa, Italy, ostensibly for coastwise trade in the Mediterranean. One of her last voyages, in 1948, she was contracted to sail Jewish refugees to the port of Haifa, Israel. After sailing secretly from Marseilles, she arrived at Haifa, 3 September. Most of those on board were former passengers of the ill-fated Exodus, which had been turned back from Palestine, the previous summer.

Malla was purchased by Israel in 1950 and renamed the INS Maoz (K 24).  She served as a training ship with the Israeli Navy until she was broken up in 1955.

Awards

Sampson Medal (1898)
Spanish Campaign Medal (1898)
World War I Victory Medal (1917–1918)
American Campaign Medal (1942–1946)
World War II Victory Medal (1942–1946)

References

Bibliography

External links

 Speaking of Pictures ... These Show the Life & Times of Famous U.S.S. Mayflower—LIFE Oct 11, 1943
 navsource.org: USS Mayflower
 hazegray.org: USS Mayflower
 Naval Historical Center: USS Mayflower

Ships built on the River Clyde
1896 ships
Patrol vessels of the United States Navy
Presidential yachts of the United States
Ships of the United States Coast Guard
World War I auxiliary ships of the United States
World War II patrol vessels of the United States
Spanish–American War auxiliary ships of the United States
Steam yachts
Maritime incidents in 1908